Dominik Widemann (born 30 July 1996) is a German professional footballer who plays as a forward for SC Oberweikertshofen.

Playing career

Youth 
Widemann started playing football with local TSV Moorenweis at the age of four. In 2008, he moved to nearby SC Fürstenfeldbruck.

Unterhaching 
During the winter break of the 2013–14 season, he was signed by 3. Liga club SpVgg Unterhaching for their U19 youth team playing in Under 19 Bundesliga South/Southwest. At the end of the season his team was relegated, him making eleven appearances scoring two goals.

While preparing for the upcoming season in summer 2014, Widemann got called by head coach Christian Ziege for the 3. Liga senior team. He made his debut coming on as a substitute at the second matchday in a home 3–3 draw versus SV Wehen Wiesbaden. His first goal in a regular game he scored only three days later in an away 2–0 victory over Jahn Regensburg where he also came on as a substitute. Subsequently, he became a regular for the team, even being the second best goalscorer with seven strikes in twelve games during the first half of the campaign. In the meantime he also signed a professional contract until 2017.

References

External links 
 
 

1996 births
Living people
German footballers
Association football forwards
2. Bundesliga players
3. Liga players
SpVgg Unterhaching players
1. FC Heidenheim players
Würzburger Kickers players
SG Sonnenhof Großaspach players
People from Fürstenfeldbruck (district)
Sportspeople from Upper Bavaria
Footballers from Bavaria
Regionalliga players
TSV Rain am Lech players